Nucleosides, Nucleotides & Nucleic Acids is a monthly academic journal published by Taylor & Francis since 2000, continuing the earlier Nucleosides and Nucleotides in series. It discusses topics relating to the biochemistry of molecules in these classes.

Biochemistry journals
Publications established in 2000
English-language journals